Sanggyai Yexe or Tian Bao (February 9, 1917 – February 21, 2008) was a Chinese government official of Gyalrong descent. Tian was one of the first ethnic Tibetans to embrace the concept of Communism and join Mao Zedong's army. Mao's army, and the People's Republic of China, later entered Tibet in 1951.

Biography
Tian Bao was born as Sangye Yeshi in Kham, a traditionally eastern region of Tibet which is now part of the Chinese province of Sichuan.

Tian first encountered Mao Zedong's army in 1935 as it pushed through western China when he was eighteen years old. Mao was trying to escape Kuomintang government forces at the time. Tian joined Mao's army and became one of the few ethnic Tibetans who participated in the Long March, a retreat by Chinese Communist forces into northern China in 1935.

Tian later held senior positions in the government and Chinese Communist Party of Tibet and Sichuan following the Communist victory in the Chinese Civil War and the 1951 occupation of Tibet. Tian was appointed the deputy secretary of the Tibetan regional Communist Party after its establishment in 1965. This was considered to be a high-profile post for an ethnic Tibetan at the time.

Tian Bao died on February 21, 2008, at the age of 92 in the city of Chengdu, Sichuan, PR China. Officials said he died of an unspecified illness, but gave no further details.

He was an alternate member of 8th Central Committee of CPC, and a full member of 9th to 11th Central Committees; A member of 12th and 13th Central Advisory Commission; a deputy to 1st, 2nd, 3rd and 5th National People's Congress; a standing committee member of 1st CPPCC.

References

External links
 Tian Bao and Tibet

1917 births
2008 deaths
Chinese Communist Party politicians from Sichuan
Delegates to the 1st National People's Congress
Delegates to the 2nd National People's Congress
Delegates to the 3rd National People's Congress
Delegates to the 5th National People's Congress
Members of the 9th Central Committee of the Chinese Communist Party
Members of the 10th Central Committee of the Chinese Communist Party
Members of the 11th Central Committee of the Chinese Communist Party
People of the Chinese Civil War
Tibetan politicians
Politicians from Ngawa
People's Republic of China politicians from Sichuan
Political office-holders in Tibet